Grovania is an unincorporated community in Columbia County, in the U.S. state of Pennsylvania.

History
Grovania had its start when the railroad was extended to that point. The community was named for the Grove Brothers, owners of a local blast furnace.

References

Unincorporated communities in Columbia County, Pennsylvania
Unincorporated communities in Pennsylvania